Parecido al amor is a Mexican telenovela produced by José Morris for Televisa in 1979.

Cast 
Tina Romero as Alondra
Carlos East as Enrique
Manuel Ojeda as Diego
Gerardo del Castillo as Ignacio
Leon Escobar as Dr.Osorio
Jose Alonso Cano as Padre Basilio
María Martín as Rosa Guadalupe
Irma Yaniré
José Marti
Alberto Insua
Enrique Beraza

References

External links 

Mexican telenovelas
1979 telenovelas
Televisa telenovelas
Spanish-language telenovelas
1979 Mexican television series debuts
1979 Mexican television series endings